Silberweiss is a synonym for several wine grape varieties including:

Chasselas, a white wine grape from Switzerland that is also known as Silberweissling
Elbling, a white wine grape from Germany
Honigler, a white wine grape from Hungary
Ovis, a white wine grape from Hungary
Räuschling, a white wine grape from Switzerland
Silberweisse
Veltliner Rotweiss, a pink-skinned wine grape